FC Orenburg-2 is a Russian football team based in Orenburg. It is the farm club for FC Orenburg. For 2017–18 season, it received the license for the third-tier Russian Professional Football League. The team previously played as FC Gazovik-2 Orenburg in the Russian Amateur Football League. Following parent club's return to the Russian Premier League, Orenburg-2 was dissolved as a standalone team in summer 2018. After Orenburg's relegation at the end of the 2019–20 Russian Premier League, Orenburg-2 was registered for PFL again for the 2020–21 season.

Current squad
As of 22 February 2023, according to the Second League website.

References

External links
  Official club page 

Association football clubs established in 2001
Football clubs in Russia
Sport in Orenburg
2001 establishments in Russia
FC Orenburg